The Butler Eagle is a daily newspaper published in Butler, Pennsylvania, United States. It serves the Pittsburgh metropolitan county of Butler.

History
The conservative family owned paper was founded in 1903 with the merging of the Butler County Observer (originally the Evans City Times) and the original Butler Eagle. The newspaper has been owned by the Wise family since its inception. The Art Deco office building was constructed in 1924, and is still used by the Eagle. It is located at 114 West Diamond Street in downtown Butler. In 2003, printing operations were moved to a new facility in the Island neighborhood of Butler. The Erie Times is printed here and delivered daily to Erie, Pennsylvania.

Assets
Other publications owned by Butler Eagle include Pittsburgh City Paper and Butler Business Matters. The Butler Eagle also owns an advertising company, Harmony Outdoor Ads.

References

External links

Publications established in 1903
Newspapers published in Pittsburgh
Butler, Pennsylvania
Butler County, Pennsylvania
Daily newspapers published in Pennsylvania